Tentets is an album by the flugelhornist and composer Franco Ambrosetti which was recorded in 1985 and released on the Enja label.

Track listing
All compositions by Franco Ambrosetti except where noted
 "Yes or No" (Wayne Shorter) – 8:07
 "Rio Morena, Allegro Con Brio" – 10:29
 "Autumn Leaves" (Joseph Kosma, Jacques Prévert) – 6:15
 "Ten and Eleven" – 9:08
 "Ode to a Princess" (George Gruntz) – 10:52

Personnel
Franco Ambrosetti – flugelhorn
Lew Soloff – trumpet
Mike Mossman – trumpet
Alex Brofsky – French horn
Steve Coleman – alto saxophone
Mike Brecker – tenor saxophone
Howard Johnson – baritone saxophone, tuba
Tommy Flanagan – piano
Dave Holland – bass
Daniel Humair – drums

References

Franco Ambrosetti albums
1985 albums
Enja Records albums